The Women's Freestyle 59 kg is a competition featured at the 2019 European Wrestling Championships, and was held in Bucharest, Romania on April 10 and April 11.

Medalists

Results 
 Legend
 F — Won by fall

Main Bracket

Repechage

References

Women's Freestyle 59 kg
2019 in women's sport wrestling